Carex helleri is a species of sedge known by the common name Heller's sedge. It is native to eastern California and western Nevada, where it grows on rocky mountain slopes and in other habitats.

Description
Carex helleri is a sedge producing dense clumps of thin, erect stems 30 to 50 centimeters in maximum height. The inflorescence bears overlapping spikes of flowers which are covered in dark brown or black scales. The fruit is covered in a perigynium which is reddish or purplish in color with a beak at the tip.

External links
Jepson Manual Treatment - Carex helleri
USDA Plants Profile
Flora of North America
Carex helleri - Photo gallery

helleri
Flora of California
Flora of Nevada
Flora of the Sierra Nevada (United States)
Plants described in 1922
Flora without expected TNC conservation status